Tony Petrossian is a commercial and music video director.

Petrossian is represented by William Morris Endeavor for feature films & television projects in the U.S.

Commercials (partial list)
Futuroscope - "Robotic Seats" (Paris, France)
Nike - "Beijing Ballers" (Beijing, China)
Zoo York - "Tough" (New York, NY)
Zoo York - "Spread The Word" (New York, NY) 
Environmental Defense Fund "Grounded" (Los Angeles, CA) 
Subway "Fence" (Charlotte, North Carolina) 
Dannon flamingo "Into Thin Air" (New York, NY) 
Beeline Telecom "Sea of Communication" (Kiev, Ukraine) 
Beeline Telecom "Hockey" (Moscow, Russia)
Beeline Telecom "Tattoo" (launch into Cambodia) (Bangkok, Thailand) 
Sony Ericsson AINO global launch (Barcelona, Spain) 
Sony Ericsson SATIO global launch (Barcelona, Spain) 
Sony Ericsson SPACE HOPPER INVASION viral film (Barcelona, Spain) 
Manchester United Football Club with Beeline Telecom feat. Wayne Rooney & Chicarito (Manchester, England)
Manchester United Football Club with Beeline Telecom feat. Wayne Rooney & Park Ji Sung (Manchester, England)
Nike "Change Sport" (Taipei, Taiwan & Singapore)
Alexander Keith's Beer "Moving Walls" (Prague, Czech Republic) 
Alexander Keith's Beer "Conveyor Belt" (Prague, Czech Republic) 
Beeline Telecom "Magnetism" (Bangkok, Thailand) 
McDonald's "Real Fruit Smoothies / Paint Ball War" (Los Angeles, CA) 
McDonald's "Photos" (Los Angeles, CA)
Minute Maid "Lion Dance" (Shanghai, China)
Coca-Cola, Burn Energy Drink "The Cap" (Los Angeles, CA & Moscow, Russia)
Anti Drunk Driving Campaign / T.Dept.Of.Trans. / "Backseat" (Nashville, TN)
Cape Cod Chips "Seagulls" (Los Angeles, CA)
McDonald's "Pinatas" (Los Angeles, CA) 
Key Bank "Beach Balls" (Los Angeles, CA) 
Singtel "Surprise Pop Performance" (Singapore) 
Lance Crackers "Keepin' it Real" (Los Angeles, CA) 
Demix Sportswear "Fitness Girls" (Los Angeles, CA) 
Nokia "Ashes" (Kiev, Ukraine)
Merrell Shoes "Car v. Bike" (Los Angeles, CA) 
Sportmaster "Snowman" (Los Angeles, CA)
Merrell "Weather Dogs" (Los Angeles, CA)
Indiana Lottery "Fellow Bingolians!" (Indianapolis, IN)
Indiana Lottery "Hoosier Lottery" (Indianapolis, IN)
Moschino Barbie (Los Angeles, CA) 
Merrell Shoes "Snow Dogs" (Los Angeles, CA) 
Barbie - Spy Squad (Los Angeles, CA) 
McDonald's - Create Your Taste (Los Angeles, CA) 
Barbie - Mix & Color (Los Angeles, CA)
Vonage - Family Phone (Portland, OR)
Maryland Lottery "Baseball Bucks" (Baltimore, Maryland)
Ilya Kovelchuk | Gazprom "G-Drive" (St. Petersburg, Russia)
Barbie - Undisclosed Project (in production)
Barbie - Undisclosed Project (in production)
Nickelodeon - Teenage Mutant Ninja Turtles, SpongeBob SquarePants, Paw Patrol, Shimmer & Shine,  Runway Fashion  (in production)
Choctaw Properties - Undisclosed Project (in production)

Music videos (partial list)

"Duality" -- Slipknot (2004) 
"Firestarter" -- Gene Simmons (2004)  
"Vermilion"—Slipknot (2004)  
"The End of Heartache" -- Killswitch Engage (2004) 
"S.A.N.T.A.N.A." -- The Diplomats (2004)  
"Before I Forget"—Slipknot (2005)  
"I'm On A High" -- Millionaire (2005)  
"No Tomorrow" -- Orson (2006)  
"Beast and the Harlot" -- Avenged Sevenfold (2006)  
"Bright Idea"—Orson (2006)  
"Graduation Day" -- Head Automatica (2006)
"Tears Don't Fall" -- Bullet for My Valentine (2006)  
"Through Glass" -- Stone Sour (2006)  
"Pain" -- Three Days Grace (2006)  
"Liar (It Takes One to Know One)" -- Taking Back Sunday (2006)  
"Eyes of the Insane" -- Slayer (2006)  
"Prayer of the Refugee" -- Rise Against (2006)
"Never Too Late"—Three Days Grace (2007)
"I'm Not Jesus" -- Apocalyptica feat. Corey Taylor (2007) 
"Empty Walls" -- Serj Tankian (2007)
"Fake It" -- Seether (2007)
"Scream, Aim, Fire" -- Bullet For My Valentine (2007)
"Sky Is Over" -- Serj Tankian (2008)
"Rise Above This"—Seether (2008)
"Breakdown"—Seether (2008)
"How We Do It In The A"—Lloyd featuring Ludacris (2008)
"What You Look For"—Sam Beeton (2008)
"You Better Pray"—The Red Jumpsuit Apparatus (2008)
"Not Meant to Be" -- Theory of a Deadman (2009)
"Careless Whisper" -- tire (2009)
"If This Is It" -- Newton Faulkner (2009)
"The Crazy Ones" -- Stellar Revival (2012)

References

External links
Taking Back Sunday's "Liar (It Takes One To Know One)" video directed by Tony Petrossian"

Advertising directors
American music video directors
American people of Armenian descent
Living people
University of California, Los Angeles alumni
University of Southern California alumni
Year of birth missing (living people)